Ziang Sung Wan v. United States, 266 U.S. 1 (1924), was a United States Supreme Court case concerning the admissibility of a confession in a 1919 triple homicide case. Scott Seligman, writing for the Smithsonian, referred to the case as having "laid the groundwork for Americans’ right to remain silent".

References

External links
 

United States Supreme Court cases
United States Supreme Court cases of the White Court
1924 in United States case law